Jóhann Kristinn Pétursson (9 February 1913 – 26 November 1984), also known as the Icelandic Giant and the Viking Giant, was an Icelandic circus performer and actor who at his peak measured  in height and weighed .

Early life
Born in Dalvík, Iceland on 9 February 1913, as the third of nine children in his family, Jóhann had a normal development until the age of 15, after which he experienced accelerated growth.

At the age of 17, he was very strong and reportedly could lift a lorry, but had back and joint issues and difficulty walking by age 20. However, he had an enlarged sella turcica.

Career
Due to his physical ailments, Jóhann was unable to find normal employment and instead toured Europe's vaudeville theatres, doing so until the outbreak of World War II. He was in Copenhagen during the German invasion of Denmark and remained there until the end of the war, working in a shipyard. In 1948, he was invited to move to the United States by the Ringling Bros. and Barnum & Bailey Circus. The tallest Icelandic man on record, his home, living trailer, vehicles, furniture, and clothing were all custom-made.

During his career, he used the stage name "der Nordische Riese Olaf" ("the Nordic Giant Olaf") in Germany, and "the Icelandic Giant" or "the Viking Giant" in the U.S. In addition to being a circus performer, he acted in several movies, such as Prehistoric Women. Early on in his career, he often wore a suit and top hat, but with the Ringling brothers he dressed as a stereotypical Viking, sporting a full beard and horned helmet.

A prominent member of the Tampa Showmen's Association (TSA) and the International Independent Showmen's Association (IISA), he was involved in their charitable activities. His memory is honoured with personal belongings displayed in the Showmen's Museum of the IISA in Gibsonton, Florida.

Later life and death
He retired in 1963 and moved to Florida. He married and had one child, of average height. He spoke four languages: Icelandic, Danish, German and English. In 1981, he was profiled in the documentary film Being Different.

After sustaining a fall in Tampa, Florida in 1984, he returned to his birthplace Dalvík, where he died a few months later at the age of 71. He is buried in Dalvík.

References

External links
The Tallest Man: Johann Petursson[link appears to be DEAD 8/9/2020]
Sideshow World gives biographical detail and notes his later, American professional career.
Tallest man in Iceland
Photo of Johann Petursson
JOHANN PETURSSON – THE VIKING GIANT
 

Pétursson, Jóhann K.
Pétursson, Jóhann K.
20th-century Icelandic people
Pétursson, Jóhann K.
Icelandic male actors
People from Dalvík
Pétursson, Jóhann K.